Dallas Doll is an Australian black comedy-drama film starring Sandra Bernhard, David Ngoombujarra, Roy Billing, Victoria Longley, Frank Gallacher, Jake Blundell, Rose Byrne and written and directed by Ann Turner.

Plot
Dallas Adair (Sandra Bernhard) is an American consultant brought to Australia to advise on a new golf course project. On the plane from L.A. she meets Charlie Sommers (Jake Blundell), the 18-year-old son of one of her bosses when there's a near crash landing, after which Dallas moves into the Sommers bourgeois home. While living with the Sommers, Dallas begins a twisted odyssey to seduce and corrupt the family which includes seducing Charlie, then seducing his father Stephen (Frank Gallacher), a workaholic lawyer who is re-awakened by sexual desire. Dallas even seduces Stephen's frustrated wife Rosalind (Victoria Longley), where Dallas introduces Rosalind to excitement of living on edge and the female body. Only the Sommer's UFO obsessed teenage daughter Rastus (Rose Byrne), along with her pet dog Argus, are highly suspicious to Dallas's agenda. Her influence over the Sommers family secured, Dallas begins to chart her final objective by appealing to the local Mayor Tonkin, (Douglas Hedge) for assistance in setting up the golf links with her wicked charms. However, fate and destiny finally catches up to Dallas when Charlie returns from his lone spiritual quest in the desert with old scores to settle where he, Argus and a spectacular visitation conspire to cause the downfall and death of Dallas Adair.

Production
Shot in April and May 1993, the film was developed with the assistance of the Australian Film Commission and made with money from the FFC. Sandra Bernhard was imported to play the lead. Ann Turner:
"Dallas Doll" essentially came from being part of and seeing how Australians really worship experts from overseas. I've done some writing workshops where that would happen. An American is brought out – and the willingness for Australians to accept with open arms whatever fraud comes out because they're American, that's absolutely the starting point of Dallas Doll.

Reception
The film was released theatrically in the United Kingdom and Germany and received some positive reviews. It was released in the United States on 23 June 1995 and had a limited theatrical run.

References

External links 

Dallas Doll at Oz Movies

Variety review
http://www.austinchronicle.com/gyrobase/Calendar/Film?Film=oid%3A142628
The New York Times Movies

1994 films
Australian black comedy films
Films scored by David Hirschfelder
1990s English-language films
1990s Australian films